Dorsum bengali is a moth of the family Erebidae first described by Michael Fibiger in 2011. It is found in India (it was described from Kolkata in West Bengal).

The wingspan is about 11 mm. The head, patagia, anterior part of tegulae and prothorax are blackish grey, while the rest of the thorax and tegulae are beige. The forewing ground colour is beige, while the basal part of the costa, costal part of the triangular medial area and terminal area are black grey. The crosslines are obsolete, except the terminal line, which is indicated by black interveinal dots. The hindwing ground colour is light grey with an indistinct discal spot. The abdomen is beige.

References

Micronoctuini
Moths described in 2011
Taxa named by Michael Fibiger